El mejor papá del mundo (The Best Dad in the World) is a 1941 black and white Argentine drama. It explores a son's gradual realization that his father is far from perfect, and also conveys a message hostile to global capitalism.

Production

El mejor papá del mundo was a black and white Lumiton film directed by Francisco Múgica and written by Sixto Pondal Ríos.
It starred Elías Isaac Alippi, Ángel Magaña and Nuri Montsé. The film was released on 14 March 1941.

Synopsis

The film depicts the changing relationship between a prestigious lawyer (Elías Isaac Alippi) and his young son (Ángel Magaña).
The son, recently graduated from college and planning to follow in his father's footsteps, gradually discovers the large gap between his idealized image of his father and the reality.
The father, who represents an international firm, is involved in a complex web of interests that places his professional ethics in doubt.
The film conveys the view that the interests of international monopolies and the Argentine oligarchy are counter to the national interest.
The film is interesting in giving a view of life in high society in Argentina of that time.

Reception

Manrupe and Portela described the film as simple and sobering, with an early anti-imperialist message, and noted that it drew on Mario Soffici's earlier film Kilómetro 111 for a boardroom scene.
La Mañana de Montevideo described it as fast-paced and interesting, always nuanced, with fine comic and emotional notes.

Complete cast
The complete cast was:

 Elías Isaac Alippi
 Ángel Magaña
 Nuri Montsé
 Hugo Pimentel
 Domingo Márquez
 Carlos Bertoldi
 Ricardo Passano
 María Esther Buschiazzo
 Salvador Sinaí
 Alberto Terrones
 Carlos Rodríguez
 Hugo Ugarte
 Mario C. Lugones
 Percival Murray
 Adolfo Meyer

References
Citations

Sources

1941 films
1940s Spanish-language films
Argentine black-and-white films
1941 comedy-drama films
Argentine comedy-drama films
Films directed by Francisco Múgica